This Immortal, serialized as ...And Call Me Conrad, is a science fiction novel by American author Roger Zelazny. In its original publication, it was abridged by the editor and published in two parts in The Magazine of Fantasy and Science Fiction in October and November 1965. It tied with Frank Herbert's Dune for the 1966 Hugo Award for Best Novel.

Publication history 
Most, but not all of the edits made for the serialized version were restored for the first paperback publication by Ace Books and the title was changed by the publisher to This Immortal.  Zelazny stated in interviews that he preferred the original eponymous title. The abridged version was novel length at over 47,000 words; the paperback version was over 58,000 words after the cuts were restored.  However, it was not until a book club version was published in the 1980s that Zelazny realized that some cuts had not been restored to the book version; thus, earlier publications of This Immortal were still not complete. The abridged magazine version also contains 10 paragraphs of text not in the book version, starting from "And the long-dormant Radpol was stirring again, but I did not know that until several days later" and ending with "The days of Karaghiosis had passed." Also, the "Synopsis of Part One" that appeared in the November 1965 issue of F&SF (immediately prior to Part Two) is written in the first person and contains material about Conrad's character and backstory that is not in the main text of ...And Call Me Conrad nor the 1980s restored version of This Immortal.

Plot summary
After being devastated by a nuclear war, the Earth is a planet with a population of only 4 million, overrun by a variety of mutated lifeforms. Worse, much of the Earth is now owned by the Vegans, a race of blue-skinned aliens who see the planet as a tourist location. Conrad Nomikos, the first person narrator, is a man with a past that he would rather not talk about who has been given a task that he would rather refuse: to show an influential Vegan around the old ruins of Earth. But Conrad suddenly finds himself the reluctant protector of this alien visitor when attempts are made on the Vegan's life. Conrad knows that keeping the Vegan alive is important—but now he must find out why.

Conrad now finds himself pitted against a group of Earth rebels that includes an old comrade-in-arms and an old lover, neither of whom can understand why he would want to protect one of Earth's subjugators. He is aided by another old friend and an old man who is actually one of his sons. It is eventually revealed that the Vegan he is escorting has been charged with the final disposition of the planet Earth. The Vegan in his turn is confounded by Conrad's actions. Ostensibly there as a tourist to see Earth's sights, he is horrified to find that Conrad is having the pyramids of Egypt torn down, more so when the immortal explains that the process is being filmed, and that the film will be run backwards to simulate the construction of the pyramids. Along the way it appears that Conrad's beloved wife is killed in a natural cataclysm.

At the end, the rebels realize that Conrad has been fighting to protect the Earth in his own way. Through actions such as the deconstruction of the pyramids, Conrad makes the Vegans see that Earthlings would rather destroy the planet's riches than see them fall into the hands of others. In the final battle to protect the Vegan, Conrad's wife appears to deliver the decisive saving blow. The Vegan sees the mettle of which Conrad is made, and decides to leave the planet in the possession of the one being with the longevity, power and moral fiber to do well by it. Conrad finds himself the owner of Earth.

Major themes 
Many of Zelazny's heroes are overmen, or even gods or demigods; Conrad Nomikos is no exception to the rule. Identified early in the book as a possible "Kallikantzaros" by his lover Cassandra (who exhibits the same abilities as her namesake to foretell the future but not be believed), Conrad is later also compared to Pan. Whether or not Conrad is a god, however, is left unclear in the book: while he has led an extraordinarily long life, it is hinted that this could be the result of mutation due to the nuclear war. Jane Lindskold, in her book titled Roger Zelazny, suggests that the fact that Conrad's face is handsome on one side and disfigured on the other is a metaphor for Conrad's ability to be both creator and destroyer, and it is not until the end of the book that the broken god can be "healed".

Zelazny declared that “I wanted to leave it open to several interpretations—well, at least two. I wanted to sort of combine fantasy and sf… either Conrad is a mutant or he is the Great God Pan. The book may be read either way.” In keeping with this, some of the clues that Conrad may be Pan are that Conrad's surname Nomikos recalls Nomios (one of Pan's titles), he plays a syrinx (panpipes) in the novel, he may be immortal, and he has a disfigured appearance (limp, scarred face, and heterochromia).

Conrad Nomikos is a prototype for later Zelazny rogues such as Corwin, the amnesiac hero from The Chronicles of Amber and the cigarette-smoking Buddha, Sam (aka Mahasamatman) in Lord of Light — both flawed humans who are also flawed superhumans.

Zelazny also identified Aldous Huxley as one model he kept in mind while writing this novel: "Bear [Huxley] in mind when constructing the cast of characters, including the monomaniac scientist as a note of thanks for the assist, but take nothing else. Do not lean too heavily on anyone."

Reception
Algis Budrys praised This Immortal as "an extremely interesting and undeniably important book", describing it as "a story of adventures and perils, high intrigue, esthetics [and] politics ... utterly charming [and] optimistic". He predicted that as examples of the New Wave, Zelazny's career would become more important and enduring than Thomas M. Disch's.

Lawrence P. Ashmead, an editor for Doubleday & Company Inc, rejected the book for publishing, claiming that "the plot is terribly thin and uninteresting." He also pans the "Germanic constructions and pseudo-clever dialogue" of the book.

Release details

As ...And Call Me Conrad
New York: The Magazine of Fantasy and Science Fiction, Mercury Press, October and November 1965

As This Immortal
 New York: Ace Books, 1966, paperback
 London: Rupert Hart-Davis, 1967, hardcover
 London: Panther, 1968, paperback
 New York: Ace Books, 1973, paperback
 New York: Ace Books, 1974, paperback
 New York: Garland Press, 1975, hardcover
 New York: Ace Books, 1980, paperback
 Irthlingborough, UK: John Goodchild, 1984, hardcover
 London: Methuen, 1985, paperback
 Norwalk, Connecticut: Easton Press, 1986, hardcover
 New York: Ace Books/SFBC, 1988, hardcover
 New York: Baen Books, 1989, paperback
 London: Victor Gollancz Ltd, 2000, paperback
 New York: Ibooks, 2004, paperback

References

Notes

Bibliography

External links
 Hugo Awards 1966
 Hugo Awards 1968
 This Immortal at Worlds Without End
 

1965 science fiction novels
1965 American novels
Ace Books books
American science fiction novels
Hugo Award for Best Novel-winning works
Novels first published in serial form
Novels by Roger Zelazny
Fiction set around Vega
Works originally published in The Magazine of Fantasy & Science Fiction
Kallikantzaros